Perry is an at-grade light rail station on the W Line of the RTD Rail system. It is located alongside the banks of the Lakewood Gulch at its intersection with Perry Street, after which the station is named, in Denver, Colorado. 

The station opened on April 26, 2013, on the West Corridor, built as part of the Regional Transportation District (RTD) FasTracks public transportation expansion plan and voter-approved sales tax increase for the Denver metropolitan area.

Perry station is located in a residential neighborhood and has no bus connections or park and ride lot.

References 

RTD light rail stations in Denver
W Line (RTD)
Railway stations in the United States opened in 2013
2013 establishments in Colorado